Sakajia Cave Natural Monument is a karst cave located  1.5 km to the north-east from  village Godogani, Terjola Municipality in Imereti region of Georgia,  204 meters above sea level.  It is located on the left slope of the scenic Tskaltsiteli Gorge across the river from Motsameta monastery, 1.5 km southwest. Many important archaeological, paleobotanical and paleozoic discoveries has been made in the cave.

Morphology 
Sakajia karst cave formed in subterranean limestones. Total length of the cave is 35 m, depth 20 m, height 6 m, width 4 m. It is a dry cave on high ground with no preconditions for formation of typical cave sediments such as  stalactites.

Fauna 
Unique conditions in the cave provide habitats for various creatures, such as Laemostenus, Mesogastrura, Achipteria, Aleurodamaeus, Metabelbella, Minunthozetes, Oribatella, Oribatula and Phauloppia.

Archaeological site 
It is a multi-layered archaeological site discovered in 1914 by R. Schmidt and  L. Kozlowski. Sakajia was the first Paleolithic site discovered in Transcaucasia and cave was named after Rudolf Virchow, a prominent scientist. 
In 1936 the excavations were resumed by M. Nyoradze, numerous archaeological and paleontological materials were discovered, and the old Georgian name of the cave was restored.
During the excavations in 1973 headed by G. Nyoradze under the upper Paleolithic layer at depths of 1.5 m stones shaped with Levallois technique and various types of beads, sachets, knives, and other items has been found.

Bones of cave bear, rhinoceros, horse, noble deer, bison, Caucasian boar, thrush and other animal bones are found in these layers. There was also a fragment of the upper jaw and teeth of a Neanderthal man. The material is dated to the Middle and Late Masons.

From the Upper Paleolithic material, various types of scrapings, cutters, gravel and shuttlecone-like knives and other items made of kaji and obsidian, lamellas and apatites are mentioned, as well as bone and horns: round bones, razor-sharp bones, razor blades. Here are fragments of the Cro-Magnon human skull from Mousterian period. In the same layers were found bones of the wisent, noble deer,  boar, moth, horse, cave bear, brown bear, cave lion, lynx and other animals. Upper Paleolithic material is biennial and belongs to the middle (developed) stage of upper Paleolithic culture of Georgia.

Numerous paleozoic herbivorous (goats, deer, roe deer), predators (cave bears, cave lions, lynx, etc.), as well as rodents and reptiles. The number of fragments of animal teeth and bones reaches several tens of thousands. This material belongs to the Upper Paleolithic (Oriniac - Lolotre).

Collection of findings made in Sakajia cave since 1914 are preserved in the Institute of Anthropology and Ethnography, Russia and in the Simon Janashia Museum of Georgia.

See also 
Tskaltsitela Gorge Natural Monument
Motsameta monastery

References

Natural monuments of Georgia (country)
Caves of Georgia (country)
Protected areas established in 2011
Geography of Imereti
Upper Paleolithic sites in Europe